Al-Bahdaliyah (also spelled Bahdaliya) is a Syrian village located in Markaz Rif Dimashq. Al-Bahdaliyah had a population of 12,330 in the 2004 census.

References

Populated places in Markaz Rif Dimashq District
Villages in Syria